Guntis Niedra (born 8 February 1943) is a Soviet rower from Latvia.

Niedra was born in Riga, Latvia. At the 1965 European Rowing Championships in Duisburg, he won silver with the men's eight. He competed at the 1968 Summer Olympics in Mexico City with the men's coxless four where they came eleventh.

References

1943 births
Living people
Soviet male rowers
Olympic rowers of the Soviet Union
Rowers at the 1968 Summer Olympics
Sportspeople from Riga
European Rowing Championships medalists